"Now That You're Gone" is the third single from freestyle singer Corina's debut album Corina.

Track listing
US 12" single

CD Maxi single

Charts

References

1992 singles
Corina (singer) songs
1991 songs
Atco Records singles